The 1968 NCAA University Division Tennis Championships were the 23rd annual tournaments to determine the national champions of NCAA University Division men's singles, doubles, and team collegiate tennis in the United States.

Two-time defending champions USC captured the team championship, the Trojans' tenth such title. USC finished eight points ahead of Rice in the final team standings (31–23). Furthermore, Bob Lutz and Stan Smith (both from USC) also repeated as doubles champions while Smith claimed the singles title over defending champion Lutz.

Host site
This year's tournaments were contested at Trinity University in San Antonio, Texas.

Team scoring
Until 1977, the men's team championship was determined by points awarded based on individual performances in the singles and doubles events.

References

External links
List of NCAA Men's Tennis Champions

NCAA Division I tennis championships
NCAA Division I Tennis Championships
NCAA Division I Tennis Championships
NCAA Division I Tennis Championships
Tennis tournaments in Texas